George Washington Richardson (October 28, 1808 – June 19, 1886) was an American politician who served as the Sheriff of Worcester County, Massachusetts, and twice as mayor of Worcester, Massachusetts.

Biography
Richardson was born on October 28, 1808 in Boston, Massachusetts. He graduated from Harvard College in 1829 along with classmates that included William Henry Channing, James Freeman Clarke, Benjamin Robbins Curtis, George T. Davis, Oliver Wendell Holmes Sr., Isaac Edward Morse, Benjamin Peirce, Samuel Francis Smith, and Charles Storer Storrow. He was admitted to the Massachusetts Bar in 1835.

Richardson married Lucy Dana White, of Watertown, Massachusetts, on January 6, 1836. they had two children Clifford Richardson and Anna Maria Richardson. 

Richardson served as the Sheriff of Worcester County, Massachusetts from 1854 to 1856. He served as the mayor of Worcester from January 1, 1855, to January 7, 1856, and from January 5, 1857, to January 4, 1858. Richardson was elected in 1854 as a member of the Know Nothing party, Richardson received a majority of 1,311 votes. In December 1856 Richardson was elected the seventh mayor of Worcester with a majority of 55 votes.

His wife Lucy died on July 20, 1875. Richardson himself died in Saint John, New Brunswick in June 1886. He is buried at the Worcester Rural Cemetery.

Notes

1829 births
Harvard University alumni
Sheriffs of Worcester County, Massachusetts
Mayors of Worcester, Massachusetts
Massachusetts Know Nothings
Massachusetts lawyers
1886 deaths
19th-century American lawyers